The 1959 European 300 m Rifle Championships was the 1st edition of the European 300 m Rifle Championships, organised by the International Shooting Sport Federation.

Results

Men

Medal table

See also
 European Shooting Confederation
 International Shooting Sport Federation
 ISSF shooting events
 List of medalists at the European Shooting Championships
 List of medalists at the European Shotgun Championships

References

External links
 
 European Champion Archive Results at Sport-komplett-de

European Shotgun Championships
European 300 m Rifle Championships